Cyperus schomburgkianus is a species of sedge that is native to parts of South America.

See also 
 List of Cyperus species

References 

schomburgkianus
Plants described in 1840
Flora of Brazil
Flora of Bolivia
Flora of Guyana
Flora of Venezuela
Taxa named by Christian Gottfried Daniel Nees von Esenbeck